Gilmore, Illinois may refer to:
Gilmore, Bond County, Illinois, an unincorporated community in Bond County
Gilmore, Effingham County, Illinois, an unincorporated community in Effingham County